The University of Washington Department of Global Health is a department jointly run by the schools of Medicine and Public Health at the University of Washington in Seattle, Washington. Its aim is to provide a multidisciplinary venue to address issues of global health at the university.

The department was begun with funding supplied by the Bill & Melinda Gates Foundation.

About the Department 
The Department of Global Health was launched in January 2007 with support from the Bill & Melinda Gates Foundation, the state of Washington, and the University of Washington, with a mandate to harness the extraordinary expertise, energy, and creativity of faculty across all 17 UW schools and colleges to create one of the most comprehensive academic global health programs in the world.[1]

The pioneering work of UW researchers in sexually transmitted diseases in the 1970s and 1980s paved the way for the university's leading role in HIV/AID research and training, and, now, global health.

The department is housed in both the School of Medicine and School of Public Health and has formed linkages across campus and throughout the world to help address not only infectious diseases but a host of pressing global health issues, including health metrics and evaluation; the health of women, children, and adolescents; health system strengthening and implementation science; climate change and health; global trauma and violence prevention; and global medicines safety with a cross-cutting focus on social justice and equity. The Center for Integrated Health of Women, Children, and Adolescents, for example, includes at least 22 collaborations (13 on campus and partnerships in Kenya, Ethiopia, Mexico, and Peru). And the initiative on Climate Change and Global Health involves more than 25 collaborations on campus and beyond.

Its closely affiliated centers also include the Institute for Health Metrics and Evaluation (IHME), the International Training and Education Center for Health (I-TECH), the International Clinical Research Center (ICRFC), the Center for AIDS Research (CFAR), Health Alliance International (HaI), and the Global Health Resource Center (GHRC).

The department has strong ties in Kenya, Peru, Mozambique, and Ethiopia. But worldwide, the department works with nearly 250 collaborating organizations, including universities and hospitals, NGOs, government agencies, and ministries of health.

Quote from Howard Frumkin MD, MPH, Dean of the UW School of Public Health: "Global health represents the best of academic health sciences -- transdisciplinary systems thinking, cross-cultural sensitivity, rigorous scientific research, hands-on participatory training, effective service delivery with impact empirically measured, and sustainable collaboration. This Department is outstanding. "

Education 
Master's Level: The department offers several global health tracks for a master of Public Health degree: General; Leadership, Policy, and Management; Health Metrics and Evaluation; Peace Corps; Epidemiology; and concurrent degrees.

Doctoral Programs: The department offers a doctoral program in Pathobiology. A doctoral program in global health with emphases on health metrics and evaluation and implementation science is in development.

Fellowship Programs: The department offers post-bachelor and post-graduate fellowship programs with the Institute for Health Metrics and Evaluation.

Certificate Programs: The department has a certificate program in Global Health and a program in AIDS and STIs. Medical students also can take a Global Health Pathway.

Undergraduate Programs: An undergraduate minor in global health was launched in January 2011.

Selection of the Chair 
Jim Yong Kim, formerly of Partners in Health and the WHO HIV/AIDS program, was originally a candidate for director of the department, but was not selected.  A controversial second selection process involving three new candidates took place in late 2005 and early 2006. The process was criticized for not being open, and there was concern among the student body and faculty about the chosen chair. Some feared that the department would be too heavily oriented towards biomedical research and biotechnology (e.g. vaccine development) and would neglect the broader issues of public health, such as social justice, health disparities, prevention, promotion, human resources in health, and public policy. Some also feared that the areas of education and service would be sacrificed for a research agenda, and pointed to the fact that one of the first steps in implementing the department was the leasing of a large facility off campus in Seattle's South Lake Union neighborhood - an area being developed as a biotechnology hub.

Those within the process argued that planning was open and that the department would be multidisciplinary and would live up to its stated vision of taking a broad approach to global health. They also noted that while the department would have some facilities off campus, it would be primarily based at the university; the deans of the schools committed to finding on-campus space to house the department's administrative offices, although much of the lab space was planned to be located in a building in the Eastlake neighborhood.

In Spring, 2006, Michael Merson of Yale University was offered the position of director. However, in July of that year it was announced that Merson had been appointed direct of Duke University's Global Health Institute.

On September 8, University of Washington announced King K. Holmes, MD, PhD, a world leader in AIDS and infectious disease research and training, to become the first chair of the University of Washington's new Department of Global Health. His leadership in global health research and training, and experience as a public-health practitioner, will serve Holmes well in leading the Department of Global Health, according to Paul G. Ramsey, dean of the School of Medicine.

See also

 Dean Jamison
 Disease Control Priorities Project
Suzinne Pak-Gorstein

External links
 Official website

References

Global Health
Public health organizations
Health education in the United States
University departments in the United States
2007 establishments in Washington (state)